Above All may refer to:
 Above All (Mustasch album), 2002
 Above All (Jonny King album), 2012
 "Above All" (song), written by Paul Baloche and Lenny LeBlanc

See also
Above It All, a 2014 album by Phillips, Craig and Dean
Über alles (disambiguation)